Dupiq (also Romanized as Dūpīq; also known as Depīq) is a village in Azghan Rural District, in the Central District of Ahar County, East Azerbaijan Province, Iran. At the 2006 census, its population was 348, in 73 families.dupiag is one of the ancent place in Arasbaran

References 

Populated places in Ahar County